Argyresthia impura is a moth of the family Yponomeutidae. It is found in the  Republic of Macedonia.

The wingspan is 12–14 mm.

References

Moths described in 1880
Argyresthia
Moths of Europe